"The Cyprus Agency" is the thirteenth episode of the first season of the American crime drama The Blacklist. The episode premiered in the United States on NBC on January 27, 2014.

Plot
After a recent spate of abductions of babies from their mothers, Red informs Elizabeth that the "Cyprus Agency" is the illegal adoption organization responsible. More or less coincidentally, Elizabeth and Tom contemplate adoption of their own which fuels Elizabeth to track down the organization's CEO, Owen Mallory (Campbell Scott). Ultimately, the task force discovers the Cyprus Agency's secret: it kidnaps young women and keeps them in captivity as breeders for the babies it puts up for adoption, and that Mallory is the father of all the children. Meanwhile, Meera willingly aids Red in his investigation for the mole. Covertly using Cooper's badge, Meera's intelligence leads Red to Diane Fowler as the ringleader of the leak, prompting him to confront Fowler in her own home, planning to kill her. She tells him that she knows about "that day", about what happened to his family, hoping Red will spare her for information. But Red still kills her, responding that he wants to know it more than anything in the world, but he'll find someone else who knows. He then calls Mr. Kaplan to clean up. In the end, Elizabeth finds herself unable to adopt a child as long as her marriage to Tom continues to suffer emotional strain. She is shown frustrated at home sitting in between baby stuff, while Tom goes to see Jolene, the woman who was flirting with him.

Reception

Ratings
"The Cyprus Agency" premiered on NBC on January 27, 2014 in the 10–11 p.m. time slot. The episode garnered a 2.5/7 Nielsen rating with 10.17 million viewers, making it the highest rated show in its time slot and the thirteenth most watched television show of the week.

Reviews
Jason Evans of The Wall Street Journal gave a positive review of the episode: "Strong episode! The Cypress story was so creepy and sick that it held my attention more than the usual weekly blacklister does". He went on to call the show "a puzzle wrapped in an enigma shrouded in mystery".

Jim McMahon of IGN gave the episode a 5.8/10, criticising the story and its direction. He went on to say: "The FBI is still dumb as a bag of hammers, Lizzy's husband is still sucking up time on the show and Lizzy herself remains uninteresting despite Red's insistence otherwise".

References

External links
 

2014 American television episodes
The Blacklist (season 1) episodes